Fabrizio Zambrella (born 1 March 1986) is a Swiss-Italian professional footballer who currently plays for FC Meyrin.

Career
Zambrella played for Brescia, leaving the club at the end of his contract on 30 June 2009. On 20 October 2009, FC Sion signed the Swiss midfielder on a free transfer until June 2013. He joined PAS Giannina on a three-month loan in January 2012. Following his return to Sion, the player was seen as surplus to requirements and did not feature at all for the first-team during the 2012–13 season. After one year out of competitive football, Zambrella made a return by joining FC Lausanne-Sport on 1 July 2013, signing a two-year contract.

International career
Zambrella was a squad member of Switzerland's teams in the 2004 UEFA European Under-19 Football Championship and the 2005 FIFA World Youth Championship.

Honours 
Sion
Swiss Cup: 2010–11

References

External links
 

1986 births
Living people
Footballers from Geneva
Association football midfielders
Swiss men's footballers
Italian footballers
Swiss people of Italian descent
Switzerland youth international footballers
Switzerland under-21 international footballers
Swiss expatriate footballers
Swiss expatriate sportspeople in Italy
Expatriate footballers in Italy
Expatriate footballers in Greece
Servette FC players
Brescia Calcio players
FC Sion players
FC Lausanne-Sport players
PAS Giannina F.C. players
Swiss Super League players
Serie A players
Serie B players
Super League Greece players
FC Stade Nyonnais players